Sale Water Park is a tram stop for Phase 3b of the Manchester Metrolink. It opened on 3 November 2014. and is on the Airport Line on Rifle Road near the Sale Water Park.

The stop has a 300-space car park which is free for Metrolink passengers. Despite this, the stop is one of the least used on the Metrolink network.

Services
Trams run every 12 minutes north to Victoria and south to Manchester Airport. Between 03:00 and 06:00, a service operates between Deansgate-Castlefield and Manchester Airport every 20 minutes.

Ticket zones 
Sale Water Park tram stop is located in Metrolink ticket zone 3.

References

External links

 Metrolink stop information
 Sale Water Park area map
 Light Rail Transit Association
 Airport route map

Tram stops in Trafford
Sale, Greater Manchester
Railway stations in Great Britain opened in 2014
2014 establishments in England